Blood Music is a science fiction novel by American writer Greg Bear.
It was originally published as a short story in 1983 in the American science fiction magazine Analog Science Fact & Fiction, winning the 1983 Nebula Award for Best Novelette and the 1984 Hugo Award for Best Novelette.

Greg Bear published an expanded version in novel form in 1985.

Blood Music deals with themes including biotechnology, nanotechnology (including the grey goo hypothesis), the nature of reality, consciousness, and artificial intelligence.

Plot summary
In the novel, renegade biotechnologist Vergil Ulam creates simple biological computers based on his own lymphocytes. Faced with orders from his nervous employer to destroy his work, he injects them into his own body, intending to smuggle the "noocytes" (as he calls them) out of the company and work on them elsewhere. Inside Ulam's body, the noocytes multiply and evolve rapidly, altering their own genetic material and quickly becoming self-aware. The nanoscale civilization they construct soon begins to transform Ulam, then others. The people who are infected start to find that genetic faults such as myopia and high blood pressure get fixed. Ulam's eyesight, posture, strength, and intelligence are all improved. The infected can even have conversations with their noocytes, some reporting that the cells seem to sing.

Through infection, conversion, and assimilation of humans and other organisms, the cells eventually aggregate most of the biosphere of North America into a region seven thousand kilometers wide. This civilization, which incorporates both the evolved noocytes and recently assimilated conventional humans, is eventually forced to abandon the normal plane of existence in favor of one in which thought does not require a physical substrate. The reason for the noocytes' inability to remain in this reality is somewhat related to the strong anthropic principle.

The book's structure is titled "inter-phase", "prophase", "metaphase", "anaphase", "telophase", and "interphase". This mirrors the major phases of cell cycle: interphase and mitosis.

Reception
Dave Langford reviewed Blood Music for White Dwarf #79, and stated that "The finale is magnificent. The only problem is that it's nigglingly close to the conclusion reached by an author extrapolating from a different start-point: Arthur C. Clarke in Childhood's End. But Bear, I think does it better – and goes beyond even Clarke. Strongly recommended."

The completed novel was nominated for the Nebula Award in 1985 and for the Hugo, Campbell, and British Science Fiction Awards in 1986.

References

External links
SF site Review

1985 science fiction novels
1985 American novels
American science fiction novels
Transhumanist books
Hugo Award for Best Novelette winning works
Novels by Greg Bear
1983 short stories
Nebula Award for Best Novelette-winning works
Arbor House books
Science fiction horror novels
Biopunk novels
Novels about artificial intelligence
Novels about consciousness
Novels about genetic engineering
Apocalyptic novels